Sons of the Jackal is a 2007 album by thrash metal/death metal band Legion of the Damned. Lyrical themes on the album include horror motifs, the devastation of nuclear war and occult and religious ideas and actions. Unusually for a Western metal album some lyrics draw on Islamic eschatology and history in places ("Alamut awake,
Hear its divine call, I am incarnate, The breath of Dajjal" from "Atomicide") and make equal attacks of both Mohammed and Jesus Christ ("I tear out the eyes of Jesus, As he hangs upon the cross, I blind the face of Mohammed, And throw his body to the boards" from "Ten Horns Arise"). The song Son of the Jackal is a reference to the Anti-Christ character of Damien in the Omen horror movies, who was born in such a manner. Sons of the Jackal peaked at #54 on the German albums chart.

Track listing 
"Son of the Jackal" - 3:52
"Undead Stillborn" - 3:59
"Avenging Archangel" - 3:28
"Death Is My Master (Slay for Kali)" - 5:09
"Sepulchral Ghoul" - 4:19
"Seven Heads They Slumber" - 1:59
"Infernal Wrath" - 4:07
"Atomicide" - 3:18
"Ten Horns Arise" - 3:31
"Diabolist" - 3:40

Personnel
Maurice Swinkels – vocals
Richard Ebisch – guitar
Harold Gielen – bass
Erik Fleuren – drums

References

External links
Official website
Legion of the Damned at Massacre Records

2007 albums
Legion of the Damned (band) albums
Massacre Records albums
Albums produced by Andy Classen